A chemical oxygen iodine laser (COIL) is a near–infrared chemical laser. As the beam is infrared, it cannot be seen with the naked eye. It is capable of output power scaling up to megawatts in continuous mode. Its output wavelength is 1315 nm, a transition wavelength of atomic iodine.

Principles of operation 

The laser is fed with gaseous chlorine, molecular iodine, and an aqueous mixture of hydrogen peroxide and potassium hydroxide. The aqueous peroxide solution undergoes chemical reaction with chlorine, producing heat, potassium chloride, and oxygen in excited state, singlet delta oxygen. Spontaneous transition of excited oxygen to the triplet sigma ground state is forbidden giving the excited oxygen a spontaneous lifetime of about 45 minutes. This allows the singlet oxygen to transfer its energy to the iodine atoms present in the gas stream;the atomic transition 2P3/2 to 2P1/2 in atomic iodine is nearly resonant with the singlet oxygen, so the energy transfer during the collision of the particles is rapid. The excited iodine atoms 2P1/2 then undergoes stimulated emission and lases at 1.315 μm in the optical resonator region of the laser. ( the upper and lower iodine atomic states are reversed with the 2P1/2 being the upper state)

The laser operates at relatively low gas pressures, but the gas flow has to be nearing the speed of sound at the reaction time; even supersonic flow designs are described. The low pressure and fast flow make removal of heat from the lasing medium easy, in comparison with high-power solid-state lasers. The reaction products are potassium chloride, water, and oxygen. Traces of chlorine and iodine are removed from the exhaust gases by a halogen scrubber.

History and applications 

COIL was developed by the US Air Force in 1977, for military purposes. However, its properties make it useful for industrial processing as well; the beam is focusable and can be transferred by an optical fiber, as its wavelength is not absorbed much by fused silica but is well absorbed by metals, making it suitable for laser cutting and drilling. Rapid cutting of stainless steel and hastelloy with a fiber-coupled COIL has been demonstrated. In 1996, TRW Incorporated managed to get a continuous beam of hundreds of kilowatts of power that lasted for several seconds.

RADICL, Research Assessment, Device Improvement Chemical Laser, is a 20 kW COIL laser tested by the United States Air Force in around 1998.

COIL is a component of the United States' military airborne laser and advanced tactical laser programs. On February 11, 2010, this weapon was successfully deployed to shoot down a missile off the central California coast in a test conducted with a laser aboard a Boeing 747 that took off from the Point Mugu Naval Air Warfare Center (for more details, see Boeing YAL-1).

Other iodine based lasers 

All gas-phase iodine laser (AGIL) is a similar construction using all-gas reagents, more suitable for aerospace applications.

The ElectricOIL, or EOIL, offers the same iodine lasing species in an alternate gas-electric hybrid variant.

See also
 Peresvet (laser weapon)
 List of laser articles

References

External links
 Popular Science: The Flying Laser Cannon
 Patent for the 'High energy airborne chemical oxygen iodine laser (COIL)'
 'Laser jumbo' testing moves ahead

Chemical lasers
American inventions